Finn Pedersen (30 July 1925 – 14 January 2012) was a Danish rower who competed in the 1948 Summer Olympics and in the 1956 Summer Olympics.

He was born in Roskilde. In 1948 he was a crew member of the Danish boat which won the gold medal in the coxed pairs event. Eight years later he and his partner Kjeld Østrøm were eliminated in the semi-finals of the coxless pair competition.

References

1925 births
2012 deaths
People from Roskilde
Danish male rowers
Olympic rowers of Denmark
Rowers at the 1948 Summer Olympics
Rowers at the 1956 Summer Olympics
Olympic gold medalists for Denmark
Olympic medalists in rowing
Medalists at the 1948 Summer Olympics
European Rowing Championships medalists
Sportspeople from Region Zealand